The Yuelu Academy (also as known as the Yuelu Academy of Classical Learning) is on the east side of Yuelu Mountain in Changsha, Hunan province, on the west bank of the Xiang River. As one of the four most prestigious academies over the last 1000 years in China, Yuelu Academy has been a famous institution of higher learning as well as a centre of academic activities and cultures since it was formally set up during the Northern Song dynasty. The academy was converted into Hunan Institute of Higher Learning in 1903. It was later renamed Hunan Normal College, Hunan Public Polytechnic School, and finally Hunan University in 1926. Yuelu Academy was once a center of Confucian learning in China.

History
The academy was founded in 976, the ninth year of the Song dynasty (960–1279) under the reign of Emperor Taizu (960–976), and was one of four most renowned shuyuan (academies of higher learning). The renowned Confucian scholars Zhu Xi and Zhang Shi lectured at the academy.

During the Qing dynasty (1644–1911), the academy inculcated an ascetic philosophy of self-examination and dedication to rescuing the world from the decadence of recent times. The academy remained loyal to the Neo-Confucian school of the Song dynasty which emphasized moral self-cultivation, community solidarity, and social hierarchy. Among the prominent alumni were the early Qing scholars Wang Fuzhi and Yan Ruyi. But by the early 19th century, academy scholars saw no contradiction in devoting serious study also to practical subjects such as martial engineering, political economy, waterworks, and management of bureaucracy. They called these studies jingshi (statecraft), made up of the character jing (manage) and shi (things, or "the world"). Early 19th century graduates formed what one historian called a "network of messianic alumni."  These included Tao Zhu, who reformed the grain transportation system and salt monopoly; Wei Yuan, compiler of works on western geography (Illustrated Treatise on the Maritime Kingdoms), the exploits of the Qing expansionist campaigns, and the basic collection of statecraft essays; Bao Shichen; and most prominent, Zeng Guofan, architect of the Tongzhi Restoration and leader of Xiang Army. Later 19th century alumni include Zuo Zongtang, a reformer faction (Yangwu) official; Hu Linyi; Guo Songtao, China's first ambassador to a foreign country; Cai E, a major leader in defending the Republic of China during National Protection War era.

In 1903 the academy became a university, and in 1926 it was officially named Hunan University.

The academy is the only one of the ancient Chinese academies of classical learning to have evolved into a modern institution of higher learning. The historical transformation from Yuelu Academy to Hunan University can be seen as emblematic of the development of China's higher education, a change which mirrors the vicissitudes of education system in mainland China. As a part of Hunan University, today the academy is a center of publication and research.

In 1988, it was listed as a "Major National Historical and Cultural Sites in Hunan" by the State Council of China.

Gallery

See also
Academies (Shuyuan)
Hanlin Academy
White Deer Grotto Academy

References

Bibliography
 

Yuelu District
Universities and colleges in Changsha
Confucian education
Confucianism in China
Chinese culture
History of Imperial China
History of education in China
Song dynasty
976 establishments
10th-century establishments in China
Confucian academies in Hunan
Ancient universities
Universities and colleges in Hunan